Kelsi Worrell Dahlia ( Worrell; born July 15, 1994) is a former American competitive swimmer specializing in butterfly and freestyle events. At the 2018 World Championships, Dahlia won nine total medals of which seven were gold medals. She qualified for the 2016 Rio Olympics in the 100-meter butterfly and won a gold medal in the 4 x 100-meter medley relay for swimming in the heats.

As part of the International Swimming League she competes for the Cali Condors.

Early life and education
Born in Voorhees Township, New Jersey, Worrell grew up in Westampton Township, New Jersey where she swam for Jersey Storm Swimming and Tarnsfield Swim Club her whole childhood. She attended Rancocas Valley Regional High School in Mount Holly, where she graduated as part of the class of 2012.

Career

College
As a senior at Louisville, she won the Honda Sports Award in the swimming & diving category in 2016.

2015
At the 2015 Pan American Games in Toronto, she won the gold medal in the 100-meter butterfly.

Worrell held the American record in the 100-yard butterfly. At the NCAA finals in March 2015, she broke the 13-year-old record held by Natalie Coughlin, and became the first woman to break 50 seconds in the event. In March 2016, she improved her record to 49.43 s.

At the Duel in the Pool meeting in December 2015, Worrell broke the world record in the 4×100 meter medley relay (short course) together with her teammates Courtney Bartholomew, Katie Meili, and Simone Manuel.

2016 Summer Olympics

At the US Olympic Swimming Trials, Worrell placed first in the 100-meter butterfly and qualified for the US Olympic team.

In Rio de Janeiro, Worrell placed 4th in the heats of the 100-meter butterfly but failed to qualify for the finals after finishing 9th in the semi-finals. She won a gold medal in the 4×100-meter medley relay for swimming in the prelims.

2018 World Swimming Championships
At the 2018 World Swimming Championships in December in Hangzhou, China, Dahlia won a record nine medals at a FINA Championships meet, narrowly taking a lead in the gold medal count with seven medals over Caeleb Dressel who also won nine medals only with one less gold medal.

International Swimming League
In 2019 she was a member of the inaugural International Swimming League representing the Cali Condors, who finished third place in the final match in Las Vegas, Nevada in December. Dahlia won the 100-meter butterfly at the final beating world record holder Sarah Sjöström for the second time of the season.

2019 World Championships
Dahlia won one gold and two silver medals competing for Team USA at the 2019 World Aquatics Championships. She swam the butterfly leg of the 4×100 meter medley final in which USA won gold with a world-record time of 3:50.40. She won silver for a preliminary heat in the 4×100 meter mixed medley and a silver in the 4×100 meter freestyle final, setting an American record with a time of 3:31.02.

Retirement From Swimming
In 2022 Dahlia announced her official retirement from the sport and now works an associate coach for the Notre Dame University swimming and diving team posting a thank you message on Instagram for all that swimming has contributed to her as a person both in an out of the pool.

Awards and honors
 SwimSwam Top 100 (Women's): 2021 (#53), 2022 (#46)

Personal life
In 2017 Dahlia married her husband, Tom. She has 4 siblings: Jarrod, Kyle, Lindi, and Taylor who were and are also swimmers have all swam for Tarnsfield Swim Club. Her brother Kyle also swam for Louisville as well as qualified and competed in the 2021 U.S. Olympic Swimming Trials.

References

External links
  (archive)
 
 
 
 
 

1994 births
Living people
American female butterfly swimmers
American female freestyle swimmers
People from Voorhees Township, New Jersey
People from Westampton Township, New Jersey
Rancocas Valley Regional High School alumni
Sportspeople from Burlington County, New Jersey
Swimmers from New Jersey
Swimmers at the 2016 Summer Olympics
World record holders in swimming
Pan American Games gold medalists for the United States
Louisville Cardinals women's swimmers
Olympic gold medalists for the United States in swimming
Medalists at the 2016 Summer Olympics
Medalists at the FINA World Swimming Championships (25 m)
Pan American Games medalists in swimming
World Aquatics Championships medalists in swimming
Swimmers at the 2015 Pan American Games
Medalists at the 2015 Pan American Games